Playlist: The Very Best of Destiny's Child is the third compilation album by American R&B girl group Destiny's Child. It was released on October 9, 2012 through Columbia Records matching with the fifteenth anniversary of Destiny's Child's formation. The compilation contained fourteen songs from the group's repertoire consisting of four studio albums.

Upon its release, the received positive reviews from critics who praised its track list featuring the band's most popular songs; however some of them noted the lack of new material as a downside. It peaked at numbers 77 and 17 on the Billboard 200 and the magazine's Top R&B/Hip-Hop Albums chart respectively, becoming the highest ranking release of the playlist album series through Legacy Recordings.

Background and release 
On July 7, 2012, Mathew Knowles, the music manager of the group, revealed that Destiny's Child would reunite after a seven-year-long hiatus saying, "We still have our joint venture with Sony, and in November, we're putting out two Destiny's Child catalog records with new material". During the interview, he also mentioned plans for a possible tour. Later it was confirmed through a press release by Music World Entertainment, Columbia Records and Legacy Recordings on September 19, 2012 that the album would be a greatest hits compilation album titled Playlist: The Very Best of Destiny's Child and it would be released on October 9, 2012 to mark the group's fifteenth anniversary since its formation.

The album contains fourteen songs from Destiny's Child's four studio albums: Destiny's Child (1998), The Writing's on the Wall (1999), Survivor (2001) and Destiny Fulfilled (2004). Group members Beyoncé, Kelly Rowland and Michelle Williams served as the producers for Playlist: The Very Best of Destiny's Child along with Mathew Knowles.

Critical reception 

Stephen Thomas Erlewine of the website AllMusic praised Playlist: The Very Best of Destiny's Child along with their other greatest hits compilation #1's for being "excellent overviews of the biggest and best female R&B group of their time". He further noted similarities in their content as they shared twelve same songs on their respective track listings. James Robertson of Daily Mirror magazine described the album as "amazing" and added that "unlike other albums that recycle good songs to ship some of their rubbish new material it's actually awesome". Consequence of Sound writer Jeremy D. Larson described the compilation as "hit-heavy". Chris Martins of Spin felt that the album "sans any big surprises" due to lack of newly recorded material by the group. Gerrick D. Kennedy writing for the Los Angeles Times felt that "sadly, [the album] won't feature any goodies that a fan of the sassy pop-R&B group didn't already own" further noting that it covered "largely the same ground" as #1's.

Commercial performance 
On the Billboard 200 albums chart in the United States, Playlist: The Very Best of Destiny's Child debuted and peaked at number 77 on the chart issue dated December 8, 2012. The album also spent an additional week on the chart. The album performed better on the Top R&B/Hip-Hop Albums where it peaked at number 17 and charted for a total of nine weeks. In November 2012, Billboard magazine revealed that Playlist – The Very Best of Destiny's Child was the highest ranking album in Legacy Recording's Playlist series. Following Destiny's Child reunion performance at the Super Bowl XLVII halftime show on February 3, 2013, the compilation climbed to number 66 on the iTunes Albums chart.

Track listing

Credits and personnel 
Credits for Playlist: The Very Best of Destiny's Child are adapted from the album's liner notes and the website AllMusic.

9th Wonder – producer
Jovonn Alexander – producer
Tim Anderson – project director
Vic Anesini – mastering
S. Barnes – composer
Angela Beyince – composer
K. Briggs – composer
Kevin "She'kspere" Briggs – composer, producer, vocal producer
Rob Carter – art direction, design
LaShawn Daniels – composer, vocal producer
Anthony Dent – composer, producer
Destiny's Child – primary artist
Patrick Douthit – composer
Jerry "Te Bass" Duplesis – producer
Chad "Dr. Cuess" Elliott – composer, producer
Fabrizio Ferri – photography
Rob Fusari – composer, producer
Calvin Gaines – composer
Sean Garrett – composer, vocal producer
Barry Gibb – composer
Robin Gibb – composer
Che Greene – producer
Clifford Harris – composer
Rich Harrison – composer, producer
V. Herbert – composer
Wyclef Jean – featured artist, producer
Fred "Uncle Freddie" Jerkins III – composer
Rodney "Darkchild" Jerkins – composer, producer
Maura K. Johnston – liner notes
S. Jolley – composer
Kandi – composer, vocal producer
Beyoncé Knowles – compilation producer, composer, producer, vocal producer
Mathew Knowles – compilation producer, composer
Lil Wayne – featured artist
LeToya Luckett – composer
Falonte Moore – composer, producer
The Neptunes – producer
Stevie Nicks – composer
J.C. Olivier – composer
Poke & Tone – producer
Pras – Featured Artist, producer
Byron Rittenhouse – vocals
LaTavia Roberson – composer
E. Robinson – composer
Cory Rooney – composer, producer
Kelly Rowland – compilation producer, composer
Rod Spicer – photography
T.I. – featured artist
Henry Towns – A&R
Michelle Williams – compilation producer, composer

Charts

Weekly charts

Year-end charts

Release history

See also 
Playlist (album series)
Destiny's Child discography

References

External links 
 

2012 greatest hits albums
Destiny's Child albums
Destiny's Child